Rick Bullock (born August 9, 1954) is an American former professional basketball player, who played collegiate basketball for the Texas Tech Red Raiders basketball team and was selected 57th  by the New York Knicks in the 1976 NBA draft.

High school career
A native of San Antonio, Texas, Bullock attended Thomas Jefferson High School. He scored 1,941 points in 104 games, with 893 of those points coming in 37 games during his senior year. During his three years at Jefferson, Bullock averaged 24.1 points a game and led the Mustangs to win 92 of the 104 games played over a three year span with him in the line-up. Bullock also led the Mustangs to the 1972 Texas 5A State Championship before losing to Dallas' Roosevelt High School. In that game he scored 44 points which, through 2021–22, still stands as the state championship game individual record for the University Interscholastic League (UIL). Bullock held the San Antonio city scoring record for 25 years until South San Antonio West Campus High School's Devin Brown broke it in 1997.

College career

Overview
Bullock was a highly recruited player during high school. He accepted a scholarship offer by Texas Tech University's head coach Gerald Myers to play for the Red Raiders. While attending Texas Tech, Bullock led the Red Raiders to two Southwest Conference titles and two NCAA tournament qualifications.

As a freshman in 1972–73, Bullock guided the Red Raiders to a 19–8 overall record, finishing first in the Southwest Conference. He averaged 13.8 points and 7.5 rebounds per game as Texas Tech qualified for the 1973 NCAA tournament, but fell to South Carolina in the opening round, 78–70.
As a sophomore, Bullock improved his averages to 21.4 points and 10.7 rebounds per game. Then as a junior, he averaged 20.9 points and 11.0 rebounds per game. In his senior year of 1975–76, Bullock led the Red Raiders (25–6 overall, 13–3 SWC) to the 1976 NCAA tournament's Sweet 16 before losing to Missouri, 75–86.

Achievements

Statistically, Bullock is near or at the top of many Texas Tech school records. He is the only Red Raider to score both 2,000 points and grab 1,000 rebounds. At one time, Bullock's 2,118 points were the scoring record as well as his career field goals record of 842 (which he held for 26 years). His 1,057 rebounds were previously a school record as well. Bullock also recorded 50 double-doubles and a career field goal shooting percentage of 57%. He once had a 10-game streak of 20 or more points.

Among myriad other accolades, Bullock was named the Southwest Conference's Freshman of the Year (1973), Newcomer of the Year (1973), SWC Player of the Year (1975), and the SWC Tournament MVP (1976). He was a one-time All-SWC Second Team selection (1973) and three-time First Team selection (1974–1976). Nationally, Bullock was honored as a freshman All-America selection in 1973 and earned Associated Press All-America honorable mention as a sophomore, junior, and senior. Bullock was the twice the leading vote-getter for Universal Sports All-America and earned USBWA All-District in his junior and senior years.

Bullock ranked in the national top 20 in scoring and field goal percentage for three consecutive seasons. He finished ranked among the nation's scoring leaders in 1974 (37th) and 1976 (24th). He was also ranked among the nation's leaders in field-goal percentage in 1974 (14th) and 1975 (21st). Bullock averaged 20.3 points and 8.7 rebounds in three NCAA tournament games. Bullock also was selected as a starter for both the East/West All-Star Game and the Pizza Hut All-Star Classic following his senior season.

Legacy
Bullock was inducted as a member in the Texas Tech Hall of Fame and the Texas Association of Basketball Coaches in 1985, the Southwest Conference Hall Of Fame in 2013, the Texas Tech Ring of Honor in March 2019, the San Antonio Sports Hall of Fame, and was listed by the UIL as one of the top 100 Texas high school basketball players of all-time in 2021.

Professional career and later life
The New York Knicks selected Bullock as the 57th pick in the fourth round of the 1976 NBA Draft. After a short stint with the Knicks in which he never appeared in a game, Bullock signed with the San Antonio Spurs in April 1977. But, like with the Knicks, Bullock was waived and never played in a game for the Spurs.

He then transitioned from the NBA to play in the Continental Basketball Association (CBA) for the Lancaster Red Roses during the 1978–79 season. There he averaged 13.8 points, 10.8 rebounds and 1.2 assists per game in his 33-game career with the team, but found tremendous success furthering his professional career in Europe playing in the EuroLeague. Bullock played for Pallacanestro Cantù in Italy and Fribourg Olympic Basket in Switzerland, formerly known as Benneton Fribourg where he won two championships in 1981 and 1982. After the 1982–83 Euroleague season, Bullock left Fribourg Olympic and returned back to the states in July 1983. Bullock reconnected with the New York Knicks again, this time under new head coach Hubie Brown, who has replaced Red Holzman, but both parties parted ways prior to the beginning of the 1983 season.

After his basketball career, Bullock returned home where he has worked for the city of San Antonio. He is married and has three children.

See also
 List of NCAA Division I men's basketball players with 2,000 points and 1,000 rebounds

References

1954 births
Living people
American expatriate basketball people in Italy
American expatriate basketball people in Switzerland
American men's basketball players
Basketball players from San Antonio
Fribourg Olympic players
Lancaster Red Roses (CBA) players
New York Knicks draft picks
Pallacanestro Cantù players
Power forwards (basketball)
Texas Tech Red Raiders basketball players